The 1965/66 NTFL season was the 45th season of the Northern Territory Football League (NTFL).

St Marys have won there 6th premiership title while defeating Nightcliff in the grand final by 37 points.

Grand Final

References 

Northern Territory Football League seasons
NTFL